James Isaac (23 October 1916 – December 1993) was a professional footballer, who played for Huddersfield Town, Bradford City and Hartlepools United. He was born in Cramlington, Northumberland.

References

1916 births
1993 deaths
English footballers
People from Cramlington
Footballers from Northumberland
Association football forwards
English Football League players
Huddersfield Town A.F.C. players
Bradford City A.F.C. players
Hartlepool United F.C. players
FA Cup Final players